Clube Desportivo Rabo de Peixe  (known as CD Rabo de Peixe or Rabo de Peixe), is a Portuguese football club based in Rabo de Peixe, Ribeira Grande on the island of São Miguel in the Azores.

Background
CD Rabo de Peixe currently plays in the Campeonato de Portugal which is the fourth tier of Portuguese football. The club was founded in 1985 and they play their home matches at the Campo de Jogos Bom Jesus in Rabo de Peixe, Ribeira Grande. The stadium is able to accommodate 2,000 spectators.

The club is affiliated to Associação de Futebol de Ponta Delgada and has competed in the AF Ponta Delgada Taça. The club has also entered the national cup competition known as Taça de Portugal on a few occasions.

Season to season

Honours
AF Ponta Delgada Taça Aniversário: 2011/12

Gallery

Footnotes

Football clubs in Portugal
Football clubs in the Azores
Association football clubs established in 1985
1985 establishments in Portugal
Football clubs in São Miguel Island
Ribeira Grande, Azores